Made in Heaven is a 2019 Nigerian romantic drama film directed by Toka McBaror and produced by Darlington Abuda. It features Nollywood's Richard Mofe Damijo, Jide Kosoko, and Nancy Isime, Ayo Makun, Toyin Abraham, Blossom Chukwujekwu, Lasisi Elenu, former Big Brother Naija housemate - Kemen, and others. The film shows its central characters seeking spiritual help in their daily lives.

Plot
After discovering that his girlfriend was cheating on him with a friend, shy Richard leaves her behind in disgust in the club only to meet Angela who had a similar encounter. On the same night, they died and on a queue to the Gate of Judgement, Angela was told to return to Earth. Richard then sought a way and escaped to fight for Angela's love, although forbidden by the guardian angel who was sent after him alongside demons to ensure he never succeeds in winning her love within seven days, failure of which would result to his soul being condemned.

Cast

Production
The film was produced by Peekaboo Consulting Limited. It was co-produced with Newlink Entertainment Limited, NewOhens Limited and Corporate World Entertainment Limited.

Release
The film was billed to be released in the summer of 2019. It was premiered on September 15, 2019 at IMAX Theatre, Lekki, Lagos, Nigeria.

References

External links
 Made in Heaven on Nollywood Reinvented
 Made in Heaven on FilmOne
 Made in Heaven on ROK

2019 films
2010s English-language films
English-language Nigerian films
Nigerian romantic drama films
2019 romantic drama films